Ralph Fulsom "Red" Marston (February 16, 1907−December 7, 1967) was an American football player.

Marston was born in 1907 in Malden, Massachusetts, and attended Malden High School. He played college football at Boston University. He later played one game in the National Football League with the Boston Bulldogs in 1929.

For more than three decades, Marston worked for the American Mutual Insurance Company. He lived in Pembroke, New Hampshire, from 1951 until his death in 1967.

Notes

1907 births
1967 deaths
Players of American football from Massachusetts
American football quarterbacks
Boston University Terriers football players
Boston Bulldogs (NFL) players
Sportspeople from Malden, Massachusetts